Selysioneura is a genus of damselflies in the family Isostictidae. There are about 16 described species in Selysioneura.

Species
These 16 species belong to the genus Selysioneura:

 Selysioneura aglaia Lieftinck, 1953
 Selysioneura arboricola Lieftinck, 1959
 Selysioneura bacillus Ris, 1915
 Selysioneura capreola Lieftinck, 1932
 Selysioneura cervicornu Förster, 1900
 Selysioneura cornelia Lieftinck, 1953
 Selysioneura drymobia Lieftinck, 1959
 Selysioneura phasma Lieftinck, 1932
 Selysioneura ranatra Lieftinck, 1949
 Selysioneura rangifera Lieftinck, 1959
 Selysioneura rhaphia Lieftinck, 1959
 Selysioneura stenomantis Lieftinck, 1932
 Selysioneura thalia Lieftinck, 1953
 Selysioneura umbratilis Lieftinck, 1932
 Selysioneura venilia Lieftinck, 1953
 Selysioneura virgula Lieftinck, 1959

References

Further reading

 
 
 

Isostictidae
Articles created by Qbugbot